The Inter-Collegiate Sailing Association (ICSA) holds National Championships in seven different categories: 
Coed Dinghy
Women’s Dinghy 
Team Racing
Women's Team Racing
Men’s Singlehanded
Women’s Singlehanded 
Match Racing (previously Sloop)

The college team that compiles the best overall record in the six categories is awarded the Leonard M. Fowle Trophy.

Teams must qualify for the National Championships through conference championships. All regattas are scored low-point with no throw-out races. Racing is done on short courses. Boats are usually rotated each race so that each team sails each boat in the fleet once. 

The ICSA National Championships rotate amongst ICSA's seven different conferences each year.

Since college sailing is a fall and spring sport, three of these championships are held in the fall and three are held in the spring.

Fall 
Women’s Single-handed, Men’s Single-Handed, and Match Racing Championships are conducted in the fall. The single handed championships are usually sailed during a single regatta in early November in builder-supplied Lasers (men) Laser Radials (women).

Spring 
Women’s Dinghy, Coed Dinghy, and Team Racing Championships take place in the spring, at the ICSA National Championship Regatta, in May. It's hosted by a member school of the Intercollegiate Sailing Association. The most prestigious of these categories, by tradition and stature, is the Coed Dinghy Championship, the oldest of the national championships (sailed since 1937) and if a school wins this event they are considered to have won THE national championship.

Trophies 
Everett Morris Memorial Trophy, college sailor of the year
Leonard M. Fowle Trophy, overall top team
Henry A. Morss Memorial Trophy, Coed Dinghy National Championship first place team
Oxford University Yacht Club Trophy, Coed Dinghy National Championship second place team
Metropolitan Sailing League Trophy, Coed Dinghy National Championship third place team
Walter Cromwell Wood Bowl, Team Racing National Championship first place team
Cornelius Shields Sr. Trophy, Match Racing National Championship first place team
Glen S. Foster Trophy, Men's Singlehanded National Championship first place finisher
George Griswold Trophy, Men's Singlehanded National Championship second place finisher 
Janet Lutz Trophy, Women’s Singlehanded National Championship first place finisher 
Gerald C. Miller Trophy, Women's Dinghy National Championship first place team
Nancy Kleckner Trophy, Women's Dinghy National Championship second place team
Ann Campbell Trophy, Women's Dinghy National Championship third place team
Janet Lutz Trophy, Women's Singlehanded National Championship first place finisher
John F. Kennedy Memorial Trophy, National Collegiate Large Yacht Championship first place team
LT Jeff Stanley Memorial Trophy, National Collegiate Large Yacht Championship second place team
McMillan Cup, New England and Middle Atlantic States Large Yacht Championship first place team

References

External links 
Official website

ICSA championships
Sail
Collegiate sailing competitions